The Kadar are a tribal community in India, a designated Scheduled Tribe in the states of Tamil Nadu, Karnataka, and Kerala. They are an aboriginal tribe whose traditional way of life has been based on hunting and gathering.The People of Paraiyar Community claims that Kadar is part of Paraiyar who lives and take care of forest and forest lives.

References

External links

Ethnic groups in India
Scheduled Tribes of India
Scheduled Tribes of Kerala
Indigenous peoples of South Asia
Scheduled Tribes of Tamil Nadu
Scheduled Tribes of Karnataka